The 2021 Arkansas State Red Wolves football team represented Arkansas State University in the 2021 NCAA Division I FBS football season. The Red Wolves played their home games at Centennial Bank Stadium in Jonesboro, Arkansas, and competed in the West Division of the Sun Belt Conference.

Prior to the season, Arkansas State hired Butch Jones as head coach after Blake Anderson departed for Utah State. The team announced Rob Harley as their new defensive coordinator shortly after Jones' arrival.

Previous season
The Red Wolves finished the 2020 season with a 4–7 record (2–6 in conference), finishing third in the Sun Belt West Division. Arkansas State was not invited to any postseason competition for the first time in over ten years. Following the season, seven-year head coach Blake Anderson left for the new position of head coach at Utah State after amassing a record of 51–37 over the seven years.  Butch Jones, former head coach at Central Michigan, Cincinnati, and Tennessee, was hired soon after to fill the vacancy.

Preseason

Recruiting class

|}
Source:

Award watch lists
Listed in the order that they were released

Preseason

Sources:

Sun Belt coaches poll
The Sun Belt coaches poll was released on July 20, 2021. The Red Wolves were picked to finish second in the West Division and fourth overall in the conference.

Personnel

Schedule
The 2021 schedule consists of 6 home and 6 away games in the regular season. The Red Wolves will travel to Sun Belt foes Georgia Southern, South Alabama, Louisiana–Monroe, and Georgia State. Arkansas State will play host to Sun Belt foes Coastal Carolina,  Louisiana, Appalachian State, and Texas State.

Troy will host two of the four non-conference opponents at Centennial Bank Stadium, Central Arkansas, from NCAA Division I FCS ASUN Conference and Memphis of the American Athletic Conference, and will travel to Washington of the Pac-12 Conference and Tulsa of the American Athletic Conference.

Game summaries

Central Arkansas

Memphis

at Washington

at Tulsa

at Georgia Southern

Coastal Carolina

Louisiana

at South Alabama

Appalachian State

at Louisiana–Monroe

at Georgia State

Texas State

References

Arkansas State
Arkansas State Red Wolves football seasons
Arkansas State Red Wolves football